Pat Kwei-Ping Yang is a Chinese-American rural education development expert,
dedicated to rural education and sustainable development in China,
with emphasis on women's literacy and health.

Pat Yang is founder of U.S.-based The Zigen Fund and China-based China Zigen Association for Rural Education and Development.

Recognitions
 2012: China News Weekly “Influencing China People of the Year” honoree
 2019: China "Honour Book of Sustainable Development Education" honoree

Documentaries
Films produced by Pat Yang and directed by Christine Choy:

 2003: Sparrow Village - young girls yearn for education in a rural village of southwestern China
 2007: No Fifth Grade - children in a village in Shanxi Province have to move to a bigger town to continue education of fifth grade and above
 2007: Miao Village Medicine - barefoot doctors and hygienists working in a remote Miao village in Guizhou

Publications
 2017: Co-creating a Sustainable Village: Teacher Training Handbook
 2018: Rural Revitalization: Sustainable Development Talent Training Handbook
 2018: Rural Adolescent Girls' Sexual Health Education Teacher Training Handbook

References

External links
 The Zigen Fund website
 China Zigen website

Chinese expatriates in the United States
Sustainable development
1940 births
Living people